Matane/Russell-Burnett Airport  is a registered aerodrome located  east of Matane, Quebec, Canada.

References

Matane
Registered aerodromes in Bas-Saint-Laurent